Tombolo Calcio is an Italian association football club located in Tombolo, Veneto. It currently plays in Seconda Categoria.

History
Refounded in 1974, from 1985 to 1989 it played in Serie D. In the 2008–09 Terza Categoria season, the team had under contract, the former Parma, Inter and Juventus player Dino Baggio.

In the 2018–2019 season, the first team merges with Vigontina San Paolo F.C. The company remains active only at the youth sector level.

In the summer of 2021, the Tombolo comes out of Vigontina San Paolo F.C., acquiring the youth sector of the A.C. Tombolo, and renaming the Tombolo Calcio.

Serie D seasons
1985–86 Interregionale/C 5th
1986–87 Interregionale/C 2nd
1987–88 Interregionale/C 10th
1988–89 Interregionale/C 3rd

Colors and badge
Its colors are white and red.

Players
Sergio Cervato 1946–1947 (youth career)
Dino Baggio 1976–1984 (youth career), 2008–2009

References

External links
Official site
Page on National-football-teams.com

Football clubs in Italy
Football clubs in Veneto